Colne Valley is a 5.1 hectare Local Nature Reserve north and east of Earls Colne in Essex. It is owned and managed by Colchester Borough Council.

The site is a linear strip along the route of the former Colne Valley and Halstead Railway, which has been converted to wildflower meadows. There are otters, bats, stag beetles and birds.

There is access from Colne Park Road in White Colne, which crosses the site.

References

Local Nature Reserves in Essex